List of radio stations in the Eastern region of Ghana in no particular order.

See also
Media of Ghana
 List of newspapers in Ghana
 List of radio stations in Ghana
Telecommunications in Ghana
New Media in Ghana

References

Tyt Fm 88.9-Koforidua

Eastern